Zoanthus is a genus of anthozoans in the family Zoanthidae. It is the type genus for its family and order.

Species
The following species are recognized in the genus Zoanthus:
 Zoanthus coppingeri Haddon & Shackleton, 1891
 Zoanthus durbanensis Carlgren, 1938
 Zoanthus gigantus Reimer & Tsukahara in Reimer, Ono, Iwama, Takishita, Tsukahara & Maruyama, 2006
 Zoanthus kealakekuaensis Walsh & Bowers, 1971
 Zoanthus kuroshio Reimer & Ono in Reimer, Ono, Iwama, Takishita, Tsukahara & Maruyama, 2006
 Zoanthus mantoni (may be synonymous with Zoanthus coppingeri)
 Zoanthus natalensis Carlgren, 1938
 Zoanthus praelongus Carlgren, 1954
 Zoanthus pulchellus (Duchassaing & Michelotti, 1860)
 Zoanthus robustus Carlgren, 1950
 Zoanthus sansibaricus Carlgren, 1900
 Zoanthus sociatus (Ellis, 1768)
 Zoanthus solanderi Le Sueur, 1818
 Zoanthus vietnamensis Pax & Müller, 1957

Aquaria

Zoanthids are prized in the fishkeeping hobby, being relatively easy to raise and very colorful. Known as "button polyps" or "zoas" they can spread to completely cover a rock with brightly colored circular patterns. It also exhibits proteins similar to green fluorescent protein.

See also
Norzoanthamine

References

 
Zoanthidae
Hexacorallia genera